Saab Information Display (SID) later also called "Saab Car Computer" (SCC) is the name for various in-car computer systems found on most Saab automobiles beginning in 1985 with the Saab 9000 and followed in 1994 with the Saab 900 NG.

SIDs typically provide functions useful to the driver such as multiple trip odometers, fuel efficiency, estimated range ("distance to empty" – DTE), current CD track or radio station, and also brief description of car system failures. SIDs designed prior to the full General Motors takeover of Saab in 2000 were mounted in the center console, usually just above the head unit and below climate control vents with the exception of 9000 models, possibly after the "facelift" in the early 1990s.

The 9000 featured the SID on the standard instrument cluster, with a car pictogram, showing open doors/tailgate/boot (trunk), lamp failures and low oil pressure in red. If there were no warnings, the white pictogram would disappear. To the right of this was the data display in orange with green background data. This constantly showed instantaneous fuel consumption on an orange moving bar display with other parameters to its left such as alternator voltage, battery cranking voltage during start, outside temperature, estimated fuel range and average fuel consumption, cycled through by pressing an INFO button on the clock on the dashboard. Also displayed were engine check warnings. In addition, the analogue electric clock module could be replaced by a digital unit that scrolled SAAB across the orange LED display on startup before showing the time. This display featured digital trip functions such as distance to destination, average speed, estimated arrival time and adjustable speed warning settings, cycled through and set by pressing several buttons and retaining the R (reset) and INFO button for the instrument cluster. When fitted, the automatic climate control (as opposed to simple air conditioning) showed the selected temperature on green LEDs on the ACC unit fitted in the centre console in degrees C or F, selected by a nearby slide switch. Heated rear window (repeated on the main instrument cluster), heated door mirrors, ventilation outlet selections (including rear side window demist) and ACC mode were also indicated on the ACC unit by green LEDs next to the selector buttons (orange for the electrically heated items). Audio functions were displayed on the head unit, also in the centre console, such as FM Radio Station Name where RDS was available (otherwise just the Radio Frequency) on a green LCD. CD track info was similarly displayed on the console mounted single CD player, where fitted, on its own green LCD. The 9000 SID was not noted for pixel failures since it appears not to be LCD based. Where a CD "pack" was fitted, it is assumed the track info would be displayed on the head unit. Reference: from personal ownership.

On 2003–2005 Saab 9-3 models, the SID was temporarily moved to the top of the dashboard just below the windshield, in an enclosed hump facing the driver.

GM began moving SIDs in all Saabs to the electronic instrument cluster, just above the steering wheel, as stock GM navigation and/or audio head units replaced the Saab-designed units in the center console. The 2005 - 2006 Saab 9-2X did not feature an authentic SID, having a less feature-rich Subaru unit instead as it was basically a rebadged 2nd generation Subaru Impreza with some styling changes.

SID pixel failure

Saab Information Displays from 1994–2003 commonly suffer from an electrical system failure that results in some or all of the on-screen liquid crystal display (LCD) pixel lines becoming invisible, rendering the SID difficult to read or, in some cases, entirely unusable. The problem is most often caused not by defective pixels, but by some or all of the LCD's flexible flat cable (ribbon cable) contacts separating from the main logic board.

Several third party vendors offer a service to permanently fix broken SIDs, for a fee.

The frequency of the problem strongly suggests a design flaw, but Saab/GM has never issued a product recall.

List of Saabs featuring SIDs
 1994–1998 Saab 900 NG
 1985–1998 Saab 9000
 1998–2014 Saab 9-3
 1997–2012 Saab 9-5
 2005–2009 Saab 9-7X

References

Automotive accessories
Onboard computers
Automotive electronics
Automotive technology tradenames
Information Display